Bantam Village is the largest settlement on the Cocos (Keeling) Islands, in Australia. It is located on Home Island and has a population of about 448, mainly Cocos Malays. Bantam was formerly listed as the capital of Cocos (Keeling) Islands by the European Union.

Climate
Being located within the tropical latitudes, the island features warm and consistent temperatures year-round.

References

Populated places in the Cocos (Keeling) Islands